List of Flamengo Categories of Base transfers 2010

Juniores Squad changes

In

Out

Juvenil Squad changes

In

Out

Infantil Squad changes

In

Out

References

List of Flamengo Categories of Base transfers 2010